Acacia rivalis, commonly known as silver wattle or creek wattle, is a shrub or tree belonging to the genus Acacia and the subgenus Phyllodineae native to southern Australia.

Description
The glabrous and shiny phyllodes are narrowed towards the base and have a prominent central vein. It blooms between May and November producing yellow flowers. The simple axillary inflorescences are solitary and have small spherical yellow flower-heads.

Distribution
It is endemic to some small areas on the Flinders Range in South Australia near Hawker in the south to around Mount Harris in the north and also around Wilgena much further to the west where it is found on ridges, stony slopes and along watercourses growing in shallow calcareous loamy soils as a part of tall open scrubland communities

See also
 List of Acacia species

References

rivalis
Flora of South Australia
Plants described in 1918
Taxa named by John McConnell Black